Cameron Neild (born 6 September 1994 in Manchester, England) is a rugby union player. He plays as a flanker. He plays for Glasgow Warriors, having previously played for Sale Sharks and Worcester Warriors.

Rugby Union career

Professional career

He was the England Under-16 Player of the Year in 2011, while in the Sale Sharks academy.

He joined Worcester Warriors for the start of the 2022-23 season. However when that club folded, Neild joined Glasgow Warriors on 15 November 2022.

He made his competitive debut for Glasgow Warriors against Bath Rugby in the European Challenge Cup in a 22 - 19 win for the Glasgow side on 10 December 2022. He became Glasgow Warrior No. 348.

International career

Neild has represented England at under-16, under-18 and under-20 level.

References

1994 births
Living people
English rugby union players
Rugby union flankers
Rugby union hookers
Rugby union players from Manchester
Sale Sharks players
Glasgow Warriors players
Worcester Warriors players